The third and final season of the American voguing competition series Legendary premiered on May 19, 2022. This season Jameela Jamil, Law Roach and Leiomy Maldonado remained on the panel of judges, Megan Thee Stallion was replaced with Keke Palmer. The superior house after ten episodes wins a cash prize of 100,000 dollars.

Contestants

House progress 

Table Key
  The house won Legendary
  The house was the runner-up
  The house won the ball and was declared the superior house of the episode
 The House receive the Gag Flag from a Judge, was declared immune for the episode and was declared the superior house of the episode
 The House receive the highest score in the grand march and was declared safe
  The house won one of the categories or received a high score from the judges and was declared safe
 The House receive the Gag Flag from a Judge and was declared immune for the episode
 The house received critiques from the judges and was declared safe
  The house received a low score but was declared safe
  The house was in the bottom two
  The house was eliminated

House scores 
Scores Order: Keke + Leiomy + Law + Jameela + Guest Judge (+ Challenge Win)= Total Score

  The house received the highest score in the episode.
  The house received the lowest score in the episode.
  The house received the lowest score in the episode and was declared immune after receiving a GAG FLAG from one of the judges.
  The house received the second to lowest score in the episode and was declared immune after receiving a GAG FLAG from one of the judges.
  The house received the highest score in the episode and was declared immune after receiving a GAG FLAG from one of the judges.

Vogue redemption battles

Episodes
The season will consist of ten episodes, with each week airing three episodes on the same day.

References

2022 American television seasons
2022 in LGBT history
Legendary (TV series)